Kurt Steiner is a personal name.

People
 Kurt Steiner (stone skipper), a Pennsylvania man who holds the Guinness World Record for stone skipping 
 One of the pseudonyms used by author André Ruellan